The 2016–17 Welsh Premier League was the eighth season of the Women's Welsh Premier League, the top level women's football league in Wales. The season began on 4 September 2016 and ended on 23 April 2017.

Swansea City Ladies won their third league title, seven points clear of the previous season's winners Cardiff Met. Cardiff Met. won both the Premier League Cup and the Welsh Cup.

Lyndsey Davies of Abergavenny Women won the Golden Boot after scoring 28 goals and also became the first player to reach 100 Premier League goals. Previous Golden Boot winner Shannon Evans finished second with 22 goals. Player of the Season was won by Abergavenny Women's Katrina French. Young Player of the Season was awarded to Alice Griffiths of Cyncoed.

In November 2016, Orchard Media and Events Group became the first headline sponsor of the Welsh Women's Premier League.

Clubs

Despite a fourth-place finish in the previous season, Cwmbran Celtic withdrew from the league for the 2016-17 citing failure to attract a manager and senior players as the reason for their withdrawal. Briton Ferry Llansawel were the team promoted to replace the relegated Newcastle Emlyn and would play their first season in the Premier League. 2015-16 League Cup runners-up PILCS moved to Abergavenny and were renamed Abergavenny Women. 10 teams ended up competing in the league.

Standings

Awards

Monthly awards

Annual awards

League Cup
This was the fourth season of the WPWL Cup and Cardiff Met won the competition for the second time in their history. Briton Ferry Llansawel, Llandudno Ladies, Swansea City, Port Talbot Town and Aberystwyth Town all received byes into the quarter finals. Cardiff City also went straight through to the quarter final stage as Cwmbran Celtic withdrew. The cup was won by Cardiff Met, beating Abergavenny Women 4–2 in the final, in spite of a sending off, with goals from Jassie Vasconcelos (2), Chloe O'Connor and Erin Murray.

Round One
Cwmbran Celtic withdrew allowing Cardiff City a bye into the quarter finals.

Quarter-finals

Semi-finals

Final

References

External links
Welsh Premier Women's League

2016-17
Wales Women